Matthew Glave (born August 19, 1963) is an American actor best known for his roles in The Wedding Singer, Picket Fences, Baby's Day Out, ER, Stargate SG-1, Army Wives, Girlfriends' Guide to Divorce, and Angie Tribeca.

Early life and education
Glave was born in Saginaw, Michigan. He attended Ohio University.

Career
Glave has appeared in numerous television shows, including recurring roles as Deputy Bud Skeeter on Picket Fences, Dr. Dale Edson in ER, Colonel Paul Emerson in Stargate SG-1, and Lt. Colonel Evan Connors in Army Wives.

He also had a guest role on 2 episodes of Charmed as Curtis Williamson, a doctor who gained the Charmed Ones' powers through blood transfusions.

In 1997, Glave appeared in Quincy Long's play The Joy of Going Somewhere Definite at the Mark Taper Forum, costarring with Gregg Henry and Frederick Coffin.

He has also appeared in Cheers, NYPD Blue, Millennium, The X-Files, Will & Grace, CSI, Nikita, and The Rookie, among others. He played the philandering "1980's guy" fiancé Glenn Gulia to Drew Barrymore's character in 1998's The Wedding Singer, alongside Adam Sandler and Drew Barrymore. He also played the brother to Mark Wahlberg in the movie Rock Star, in 2000. He played Bennington Cotwell in the 1994 film Baby's Day Out. He also played antagonistic Brick Davis in the 2001 comedy film Corky Romano. In 2011, he played the antagonist Dr. Olson in Disney Channel's The Suite Life Movie. He also played Wayne in My Name Is Earl.

He appeared in the second episode ABC drama series Revenge, as a wealthy Wall Street hedge fund manager Bill Harmon, in September 2011. He has also made appearances in The Closer and the film Argo.

Glave also appeared in the re-imagined Hawaii Five-0 TV series, guest-starring in the Season 4 episode, "Na hala a ka makua (Sins of the Father)", playing a fake FBI agent who is actually infamous gangster Julian Lynch.

He starred in the 2018 feature film Funny Story, written and directed by Michael J. Gallagher, which co-starred Emily Bett Rickards. The film premiered at the 2018 Slamdance Film Festival in Utah, and went on to win the Audience Award at the Sonoma International Film Festival in California. Glave won the Best of the Fest, Best Actor Award at the Breckenridge Festival of Film in September 2018, and is nominated in the Leading Actor in a Feature category at the Southampton International Film Festival, due to be awarded in October 2018.

Personal life 
He is married to Anita Barone, and they have two daughters, Madeline and Roxanne.

Filmography

Film

Television

References

External links

1963 births
Male actors from Michigan
American male film actors
American male television actors
Living people
Ohio University alumni
People from Saginaw, Michigan
20th-century American male actors
21st-century American male actors